WWE Raw, also known as Monday Night Raw or simply Raw, is an American professional wrestling television program produced by WWE that currently airs live every Monday at 8 p.m. ET on the USA Network in the United States. The show features characters from the Raw brand, to which WWE employees are assigned to work and perform. The show debuted on January 11, 1993 and is currently considered to be one of two flagship shows, along with Friday Night SmackDown. 
In September 2000, Raw moved from the USA Network to TNN, which rebranded to Spike TV in August 2003. On October 3, 2005, Raw returned to the USA Network, where it remains to this day. The WWE Network has ceased operations in the United States as of April 5, 2021, with all content being moved to Peacock TV, which currently has most Raw episodes, excluding content that was censored or removed by Peacock TV's standards and practices department. Recent episodes are still available for on-demand viewing 30 days after the original air date.

Since its first episode, Raw has been broadcast live from 208 different arenas, 171 cities and towns, and ten different nations: United States, Canada, United Kingdom, Afghanistan in 2005, Iraq in 2006 and 2007, South Africa, Germany, Japan, Italy, and Mexico.

History 

Beginning as WWF's Monday Night Raw, the program first aired on January 11, 1993 on the USA Network as a replacement for Prime Time Wrestling, which aired on the network for eight years. The original Raw was sixty minutes in length and broke new ground in televised professional wrestling. Traditionally, wrestling shows were pre-taped on sound stages with small audiences or at large arena shows. The Raw formula was considerably different from the pre-taped weekend shows that aired at the time such as Superstars and Wrestling Challenge. Instead of matches taped weeks in advance with studio voice overs and taped discussion, Raw was a show shot and aired to a live audience, with angles and matches playing out as they happened.

Raw originated from the Grand Ballroom at the Manhattan Center, a small New York City theater, and aired live each week. The combination of an intimate venue and live action proved to be a successful improvement. However, the weekly live schedule proved to be a financial drain on the WWF. From spring 1993 until spring 1997, Raw would tape several week's worth of episodes after a live episode had aired. The WWF taped several weeks worth of Raw from the Mid-Hudson Civic Center in Poughkeepsie, New York in April 1993, and again in June and October. The first episode produced outside of New York was taped in Bushkill, Pennsylvania in November 1993 and Raw left the Manhattan Center permanently as the show would be taken on the road throughout the United States and had in smaller venues.

On September 4, 1995, the WWF's chief competitor World Championship Wrestling began airing its new wrestling show, Monday Nitro, live each week on TNT, which marked the start of the Monday Night Wars. Raw and Nitro went head-to-head for the first time on September 11, 1995. At the start of the ratings war in 1995 through to mid-1996, Raw and Nitro exchanged victories over each other in a closely contested rivalry. Beginning in mid-1996, however, due to the nWo angle, Nitro started a ratings win-streak that lasted for 84 consecutive weeks, ending on April 13, 1998. On February 3, 1997, Raw went to a two-hour format, to compete with the extra hour on Nitro (which had been expanded to two hours in the summer of 1996), and by March 10, it was renamed to Raw Is War. It was also during the time Raw would be aired live more often. After WrestleMania XIV in March 1998, the WWF regained the lead in the Monday Night Wars with its new "WWF Attitude" brand. The April 13, 1998 episode of Raw Is War, which was headlined by a match between Stone Cold Steve Austin and Vince McMahon, marked the first time that WCW had lost the head-to-head Monday night ratings battle in the 84 weeks since 1996.

On January 4, 1999, Mick Foley, who had wrestled for WCW during the early 1990s as Cactus Jack, won the WWF Championship as Mankind on Raw Is War. On orders from Eric Bischoff, Nitro announcer Tony Schiavone gave away this previously taped result on a live Nitro and then sarcastically added, "That's gonna put some butts in the seats", consequently resulting in over 600,000 viewers switching channels to Raw Is War to see the underdog capture the WWF Championship. This was also the night that Nitro aired a WCW World Heavyweight Championship match in which Kevin Nash laid down for Hollywood Hogan after Hogan poked him in the chest.

On June 28, 2000, Viacom won the landmark deal with the WWF to move all of its WWF programs stemming from the lawsuit action against WWF from USA Network. The new television contract and the subsequent purchase of competitor WCW led to many changes in WWF's programming content. Raw Is War premiered on TNN on September 25, 2000.

WCW's sharp decline in revenue and ratings led to AOL Time Warner selling selected assets such as the WCW name, tapes, and contracts to the WWF in March 2001 for $3 million. The final episode of Nitro, which aired on March 26, 2001, began with Vince McMahon making a short statement about his recent purchase of WCW and ended with a simulcast with Raw on TNN and Nitro on TNT including an appearance by Vince's son Shane. The younger McMahon interrupted his father's gloating over the WCW purchase to explain that Shane was the one who actually owned WCW, setting up what became the WWF's "Invasion" storyline. Following the purchase of WCW and the September 11 attacks, the program was retitled as Raw on October 1, 2001, permanently retiring the Raw Is War moniker in prelude to the upcoming United States invasion of Afghanistan.

In March 2002, as a result of the overabundance of talent left over from the Invasion storyline, WWF instituted a process known as the "brand extension", under which Raw and SmackDown! would be treated as two distinct divisions, each with their own rosters and championships. Shortly thereafter, the WWF was legally required to change the name of the company to World Wrestling Entertainment.

On March 10, 2005, Viacom and WWE decided not to go on with the agreement with Spike TV, effectively ending Raw and other WWE programs' tenure on the network when their deal expired in September 2005. On April 4, 2005, WWE announced a three-year deal with NBCUniversal to bring Raw back to its former home, the USA Network, with two yearly specials on NBC and a Spanish Raw on Telemundo. On the same week as Raws return to the USA Network, Spike TV scheduled Ultimate Fighting Championship's live Ultimate Fight Night in Raw's old timeslot in an attempt to go head-to-head with Raw.

Since the move to USA Network, Raw has been pre-empted during the U.S. Open, which aired on USA, resulting the program to be moved to SciFi, a sister channel to USA, for three years. Since 2016, the two-hour version of that week's Raw has aired on Syfy. In February 2022, Raw temporarily moved to Syfy for two episodes due to USA's coverage (as part of NBC Sports) of the 2022 Winter Olympics.

On the August 29, 2011 episode of Raw, it was announced that performers from Raw and SmackDown were no longer exclusive to their respective brand, thus effectively dissolving the brand extension. On July 23, 2012, Raw aired its 1,000th episode, which also began its permanent three-hour format. On January 14, 2013, Raw celebrated its 20th year on the air. On May 25, 2016, WWE reintroduced the brand split, and a new set with red ring ropes, a brand new stage, used at SummerSlam. Furthermore, the broadcast table was moved to the entrance ramp similar to how it was in 2002–2005. On January 22, 2018, WWE celebrated the 25th anniversary of Raw with a simulcast show at the Barclays Center in Brooklyn and the home of the first Monday Night Raw, the Manhattan Center. On the February 19 episode of Raw, six days before Elimination Chamber, seven participants of the men's Elimination Chamber match, Braun Strowman, Elias, Finn Bálor, John Cena, Roman Reigns, Seth Rollins and The Miz, were involved in a Gauntlet match that began with Reigns and Rollins. Strowman won the Gauntlet match by pinning The Miz in what was the longest match in WWE history, lasting nearly two hours.

From March 12, 2020 to August 18, 2020, WWE announced that all of its live programs would air from the WWE Performance Center in Orlando, Florida without an audience until further notice beginning with the following day's episode of SmackDown due to the COVID-19 pandemic that resulted in the suspension of many professional sports leagues. On the May 25 episode of Raw, NXT trainees were added into live crowds at the Performance Center. In August, all programming was moved to the new, state-of-the-art WWE ThunderDome inside of the Amway Center in Orlando. On May 21, 2021, WWE announced that they will return in front of live fans with a 25 city tour, therefore the July 12, 2021 edition of Raw would be the final WWE ThunderDome show.

Production 

Raws original set featured red, white, and blue ring-ropes, a blue ring-apron, blue steps, and a small stage made of neon light tubes. Since March 10, 1997, broadcasts of Raw were split into two hours and given hourly names for television ratings purposes, with the first hour being referred to as Raw Is War and the second as War Zone in television listings, and by the show's on-screen graphics beginning with the June 9, 1997 episode. War Zone opened with simply the Raw intro repeated, punctuated with the War Zone logo, until the November 24, 1997 broadcast when it finally debuted its own distinct opening video, albeit simply a remixed Raw opening video. In 1995, the entrance way was changed to feature "Raw" in giant letters.

In 1997, WWF changed to red ring-ropes for Raw as well as Raw Is War being written along the ring due to their rivalry with WCW. They also updated the stage to feature a 70 foot tall large screen video wall known as the "TitanTron", which consisted a projection screen with several metal stage trusses and a video projector. The set also initially featured curtains on each side with truss beams and lighting later bearing the "WWF Attitude" banner on the sides. By 1999, the WWF added the "WWF.com: 'Download This!'" logo on the bottom of the TitanTron and added two vertical sides on the stage.

With Raw moving to TNN from USA beginning with the September 25, 2000 episode, the TNN network logo was added on top of the TitanTron on the December 11, 2000 episode. The Chyron graphics were added to the bottom from the July 2, 2001 episode.

Beginning October 1, 2001, in direct response to the September 11 attacks, the first hour was referred to as Raw instead of Raw Is War and the second hour changed from the War Zone to the Raw Zone by the show's on-screen graphics; however, announcers would generally refer to the entire two-hour block as Raw on-air. Raw updated to a new, industrial-inspired, parallelogram-shaped TitanTron in 2002. When the War ended, they began advertising their website on the ring aprons instead. They occasionally used black ropes. Like the previous set, the TNN logo was relocated to the bottom side of the TitanTron which was then replaced by the Spike TV logo on August 11, 2003 upon network relaunch. During the July 25, 2005 broadcast of Raw in Cleveland, Ohio, a special stage design was built for the John Cena-Chris Jericho Battle of the Bands concert.

The 2002 set was designed by Production Designer Jason Robinson and it is larger than the previous TitanTron with the dimensions of 55 foot wide by 25 foot tall weighing about 4,000 lbs. and requires 3 18,000 watt projector screens to power the TitanTron.

On October 3, 2005, as Raw returned to USA Network, the 2002 set was retained but the beams and lighting on the sides were modified. The Spike TV logo was removed from the bottom side of the TitanTron. No changes to the Raw set beyond October 9, 2006 when it unveiled the new logo and opening intro featuring "...To Be Loved" by Papa Roach as its theme song and scenes from New York City, the birthplace of Raw, with the ending of the intro shows the rooftop of Madison Square Garden. However, the logo and intro was retained until November 9, 2009 even with the changeover to high-definition broadcast on January 21, 2008, replacing the previous set which the "Minitron" was destroyed by Triple H when Vince McMahon's face was shown.

From November 16, 2009 to July 16, 2012, the theme song for the Raw brand was "Burn It to the Ground" by Nickelback. Prior to this, the theme song for Raw was "...To Be Loved" by Papa Roach, which had been used since October 9, 2006 and "Across The Nation" by The Union Underground which was used from April 1, 2002 to October 2, 2006. The rap outro of "Thorn In Your Eye" featuring Scott Ian of Anthrax was the theme song from March 31, 1997 to March 25, 2002.

On May 17, 2012, WWE and USA Network announced that Raw would switch to a permanent three-hour format beginning with the 1,000th episode on July 23, 2012. Since then, all three hours of the broadcast have been known solely as Raw, though they are still considered three separate programs for Nielsen ratings purposes (as indicated by the on-screen copyright notice shown near the end of each hour). In 2008, Raw went HD debuting a new stage. In 2010, WWE retired the red ropes for Raw after thirteen years for an all white scheme, and in 2012 became standard for all WWE programming. In 2012, Raw updated their HD set.

Starting in mid 2014, this set would also be featured in pay-per-views. From late September through the end of October 2012, the middle rope at all WWE programming was changed to pink due to WWE's alliance with the Susan G. Komen organization for Breast Cancer Awareness Month. This was repeated in 2013, from late September to early November, and it was repeated in 2014 from 29 September. WWE is one of many organizations who provide financial contributions as well as getting customers and employees to support the cause.

On August 18, 2014, Raw switched to a full 16:9 letterbox widescreen presentation, with a down-scaled version of the native HD feed on a 4:3 SD feed. In conjunction with this, Raw updated its graphics package, with the new WWE logo (first used with the WWE Network's launch in February) now on the lower-right corner of the screen, right next to the word, "Live". Also, the new WWE logo is seen on the ring's turnbuckle covers. The USA Network logo has also been moved to the lower-left hand corner of the screen. Also, Raws theme song ("The Night") was modified. On re-runs on the WWE Network and on delayed broadcasts for most international markets, Raw is edited without the word "LIVE" and the hashtag.

On March 23, 2015, WWE added a small LED board to the left side of the ring on Raw. This LED board was also used at WrestleMania 31. The LED board since is now on an on/off basis, featuring in some weeks and not others. On the 1,000th episode of Raw, "The Night" by Kromestatik debuted as the theme for Raw while "Energy" by Shinedown served as the secondary theme-song until August 18, 2014, when it was replaced with "Denial" by We Are Harlot.

On the September 14, 2015 season premiere of Raw, the middle rope was colored gold. Throughout the month of October 2015, the program partnered with Susan G. Komen for the Cure to promote Breast Cancer Awareness Month, with various stage elements being made pink. On the November 16, 2015, episode of Raw, WWE had a moment of silence for the victims of the terrorist attack in Paris, France, on November 13, 2015. Another moment of silence was held months later in June for the victims of the Orlando nightclub shooting.

On July 25, 2016, the ropes returned to red, the announce table moved back to the top of the stage for the first time since 2005, and a new HD set and graphics were debuted. The new set was almost identical to the set used for SummerSlam 2012 and 2013. It received some negativity after the newly dubbed "New Era" was using an older set. The set was revamped just four weeks later with a more elaborate and distinctive design. The new set featured the absence of a traditional TitanTron which had been custom since 1997. In its place was a curved LED banner with several rows of rectangle LED lights behind it. The new set also introduced LED floor panels on the entrance ramp along with LED ring posts. On the January 29, 2018 episode of Raw, new graphics and an updated logo were introduced, which lasted until September 23, 2019.

On September 30, 2019 for its season premiere (and coinciding with the premiere of SmackDown on Fox later that week), Raw introduced a new set (including the reinstatement of pyrotechnics, which had been dropped in 2017 due to budget issues), updated logo (cropped with a chevron to make it resemble the corner of a ring), and new theme music ("Legendary" by Skillet). It was also revealed that both shows will now be staffed by separate writing teams.

In September 2021, the ropes would turn white from red permanently which would also apply the same to SmackDown. Meaning all WWE programming except NXT UK use white ropes once again just like December 2012 – July 2016.

On November 22, 2021, an updated version of the 2019 logo was introduced, alongside new graphics, and theme song.

In February 2022, Raw and NXT temporarily moved to Syfy in the United States, due to USA Network broadcasting coverage of the 2022 Winter Olympics.

According to Eric Bischoff on the episode of WWE Confidential, the show utilizes 13 cameras at the cost of $85,000.

Theme music 

Notes 
  Bold song titles denotes that the song is currently being used as the show's theme.

Name-related lawsuits 
The name for Raw was disputed in June 2009 when Muscle Flex Inc., a Los Angeles-based fitness company, had taken legal action against the WWE after a court ruled that some of WWE's trademarks related to Raw were similar enough to the In the Raw trademark that they caused confusion among Canadians. On June 18, 2008, the Canadian Intellectual Property Office then issued a final decision that found certain wares listed in the trademark application from WWE (No. 1,153,018) were confusingly similar and thus lacked distinctiveness from the Muscle Flex trademark, which Muscle Flex is in the process of acquiring. The WWE appealed the CIPO's ruling to the Federal Court of Canada, but failed to file the required documents by the deadline.

In August 2009, the court ruled in favor of Muscle Flex, Inc. that it was successful in defending its In the Raw trademark against the WWE. In a press release date issued on July 20, 2009, Muscle Flex Inc. disclosed that it was in possession of WWE Raw-labeled items that it believes directly infringe on its In the Raw trademark such as various CDs, VHS tapes, and a number of apparel items. According to the WWE's most recent reported financial quarter in 2009, combined sales of WWE's consumer products and digital media business segments produced $40 million in global revenues. In previous quarters, these numbers were even higher.

Similarly, in June 2017, the WWE issued a legal order to Raw Motors, an automobile repair company in Colwick, UK, over a logo that it claims infringes on one of its logos for Raw that was used from 2006 to 2012.

Special episodes 

Throughout its broadcast history, the show has aired episodes that have different themes. Some of them are yearly events such as the Slammy Awards. Others include tributes to various professional wrestlers who have recently died or retired from actively performing, as well as episodes commemorating various show milestones or anniversaries such as Raw 1000, which celebrated the 1000th broadcast.

Episodes

On-air personalities 

The show features various on-air personalities including the wrestlers themselves (both males and females), ring announcers, commentators, on-screen authority figures and musicians. Raw also has had various recurring on-air segments hosted by members of the roster. The current Commentators for RAW in the United States are Corey Graves and Kevin Patrick

Broadcast 
In the United States, the show airs live every Monday at 8 p.m. ET on the USA Network. Occasionally, Raw is aired on same-day tape delay when WWE is on an overseas tour. Raw is also shown live on BT Sport in the United Kingdom and Ireland, in a deal which began January 2020. Raw airs live in India at 5:30 a.m. on Tuesdays on Sony Ten 1. Since October 6, 2014, Raw has been airing live throughout Latin America on Fox Sports. The show also airs live on Supersport in South Africa on Tuesdays at 02:00 am CAT. Raw had aired in Australia on Fox8 since 2003, usually on a 27-hour tape delay, but has started airing live as of February 4, 2014. Syfy in the United States started airing a 2-hour replay of Raw on May 20, 2016. On June 26, 2018, WWE and USA Network announced a five-year contract extension for Raw. The new agreement for the live, weekly three-hour block commenced in October 2019. Clips from some WWE shows have also been shown on Fox Sports.com.

Online streaming 
On September 24, 2012, Hulu signed a multi-year deal with WWE to stream all of the company's TV shows and some of its web series which includes Raw. Episodes of Raw are available for viewing the following day as a condensed 90-minute version is available, not the full version as shown the previous night on the USA Network.

As of December 9, 2016, all episodes of Raw are available on demand on the WWE Network. Recent episodes are available for on-demand viewing 30 days after their original air date.

After WrestleMania 32 in 2016, WWE began with airing the newest episodes of Raw and SmackDown on YouTube for countries that do not air WWE programming on traditional TV for free in less than 24 hours after the original broadcast (The links are blocked in countries where the shows are traditionally available). The 90-minute Hulu version gets put on YouTube for international audiences.

Canada 
From 1995 to 2006, Raw was shown on The Sports Network (TSN) until it moved to rival sports broadcaster The Score (now renamed Sportsnet 360) after it was announced that TSN would be carrying Monday Night Football for the 2006 season. This meant that Canadian viewers would have to watch via tape-delay, as The Score did not broadcast Raw live at that time. Around that time, The Score aired Countdown to Raw until May 2013 when Raw is shown live to match the United States airtime. It was also shown on CKVR-TV in Barrie and CKMI-TV in Quebec until 2009.

During its run on TSN, which aired live, Raw occasionally had been censored live for extremely violent scenes, or when female wrestlers or characters were assaulted by male wrestlers (particularly one segment that featured the 3-Minute Warning assaulting Kitana Baker). These actions are supposed to be in order to meet Canadian broadcast standards, with repeat broadcasts often more heavily edited. This move had disappointed many wrestling fans over the years, and is unusual since the violence of wrestling scenes are not significantly different from other television programs aired on regular Canadian networks. 

Due to Rogers holding the rights to the National Hockey League broadcasts, Raw also airs on its OLN channel. All archived broadcasts of Raw are available on the WWE Network. Rogers Media secured the rights to Canadian WWE programming until 2024.

The Middle East 
Raw airs live in the MENA region on Shahid streaming platform Tuesday mornings, and later on the same day, a one-hour version airs on MBC Action at 8 PM Egypt Standard Time. It also airs on FM1 in Iran and on Sport 1 and Sport 1 HD in Israel. Raw further began airing on D-Smart in Turkey.

Europe 
In Austria, Germany, Luxembourg, Liechtenstein and Switzerland, Raw airs live on DAZN and with German commentary on ProSieben MAXX every Wednesday at 10pm. In Belgium, Raw airs on ABXplore (in French) and on Play6.

In Czech Republic, Raw airs on Nova Sport. In France, Raw airs on AB1 and L’Équipe every Saturday.

In Italy, Raw airs live on Discovery Plus and with the italian commentary 7 days after on DMAX.

In Lithuania, Raw airs on BTV. In Poland, Raw airs on Extreme Sports Channel.

In Portugal, Raw airs live on Sport TV with Portuguese commentary. In Romania, Raw airs on Telekom Sport.

In Russia, Raw airs on Match! Fighter with Russian commentary. In Serbia, Raw was airs on Prva Srpska Televizija., like it was airs on OBN in Bosnia and Herzegovina and on RTL 2 in Croatia.

In Spain, Raw aired on Mega every Saturday at 1pm with Spanish commentary.

In United Kingdom and Ireland, Raw airs live on BT Sport, with a one-hour version airing on Channel 5 every Sunday at 10:30am.

Asia and Pacific 
Raw airs on Sony Ten 1 and Sony Ten 1 HD in Nepal. It airs on Mola TV On-Demand in Indonesia.

Raw airs live on Sony Ten 1 HD and Sony Ten 1 in India. And airs exclusive in Pakistan and Sri Lanka.

Raw streams live on TAP GO app with a live and encore telecast on TAP Sports (Philippines) on the same day and 5 in delayed telecast every Sunday nights.

Raw airs live on Starhub's Hub Sports 2 in Singapore.

Raw airs both live and delayed on Fox8 and Thursday nights on 9Go! as a one-hour version in Australia.

Raw airs live on J Sports 4 in Japan.

Raw airs live on Sky 5 and Friday nights on Prime as a one-hour version in New Zealand.

Raw airs in China on various local networks within China and Videoland Television Network in Taiwan in both English and Thai.

Raw airs on ViuTVsix in Hong Kong, on Ten Sports in Pakistan, and on IB Sports in South Korea.

Latin America 
Raw airs live on Fox Sports in Mexico and across Central and South America. It also airs on La Red in Chile, Unitel in Bolivia, Canal Uno in Colombia, Teleamazonas in Ecuador, Andina de Televisión in Peru, Repretel: Canal 11 in Costa Rica, Canal VTV in El Salvador, Canal 5 in Honduras, RPC Canal 4 in Panama and Imagen Televisión in Mexico.

South Africa 
Previously the rights to broadcast Raw, along with other WWE shows, were held by free-to-air broadcaster e.tv. Raw would play on Sundays in the evening, with a 7-day delay, edited to one hour and was the most watched program on the channel. However, in 2017 e.tv decided not to renew its broadcasting deal with WWE. The rights were later resold to SuperSport (the initial broadcasters of WWE programming).

In 2019 SuperSport, along with its parent company MultiChoice, signed a deal to broadcast the 24-hour WWE channel as a pop-up channel for five months on their DStv platform. It is now a permanent channel on DStv under the channel number 128

Jamaica 
WWE Raw airs live on Flow 1 and has a replay on Saturdays at 12 PM.

Broadcast history

United States

Canada

Awards and nominations

References

External links 

 WWE Raw at USANetwork.com
 
 

 Peacock

 
1993 American television series debuts
2000s American television series
2010s American television series
2020s American television series
American live television series
Spike (TV network) original programming
USA Network original programming
English-language television shows